A multiple-system operator (MSO) is an operator of multiple cable or direct-broadcast satellite television systems. A cable system in the United States, by Federal Communications Commission (FCC) definition, is a facility serving a single community or a distinct governmental entity, each of which has its own franchise agreement with the cable company. Though in the strictest sense any cable company that serves multiple communities is an MSO, the term today is usually reserved for companies that own multiple cable systems, such as Rogers Communications, Shaw Communications, and Videotron in Canada; Altice USA, Charter Communications, Comcast and Cox Communications in the United States; or Virgin Media in the UK.

Top multichannel video service providers in the United States by number of subscribers
All data from Leichtman Research Group, Inc. except where noted

Top multichannel video service providers outside of US, by number of subscribers

See also
 List of countries by number of broadband Internet subscriptions
 List of countries by number of Internet users
 List of countries by number of telephone lines in use
 List of countries by smartphone penetration
 List of mobile network operators
 List of telephone operating companies
 Multichannel television in the United States

References

Cable television in the United States